WL may refer to:

Arts and entertainment
 Wario Land: Super Mario Land 3, a Wario Land series video game for the Game Boy
 The Weakest Link, a television program
 White Lies (band), an English indie rock band
 Wisteria Lane, the primary setting of Desperate Housewives
 Westlife, an Irish pop band

Science and technology
 Wavelength, a property of all physical waves
 Wetland, a land area that is saturated with water
 Wetting layer, in nanotechnology
 Windows Live, a set of web services and software from Microsoft 
 Wood's lamp, a diagnostic tool used in dermatology 
 Working level, a measure of exposure to radon gas
 Wear leveling

Other uses
 World Leader, the athlete with the best mark, time or score worldwide in the current season
 Wehrmacht Luftwaffe, on license plates of the German air force during World War II
 West Lafayette, Indiana
 White Liberal (phrase), a phrase coined by Paul Farmer in Tracy Kidder's 2005 book Mountains Beyond Mountains
 Whole language, a literacy philosophy which emphasizes that children should focus on meaning and strategy instruction
 Wiara Lecha, a former football supporters group in Poland and now an independent football club
 WikiLeaks, a document archive website used by whistleblowers